Bezuidenhouts Pass is a mountain pass located in the northern part of KwaZulu-Natal province of South Africa on the road between Harrismith and Bergville.

The pass is located between Van Reenen's and Oliviershoek. It is a gravel road that starts about 1 km outside Harrismith town centre ending up in Bergville. The pass is very remote, with very little usage and a 4x4 is recommended although not necessary for a vehicle with good ground clearance. The landscape is beautiful in this region.

Mountain passes of KwaZulu-Natal